Sorority Babes in the Slimeball Bowl-O-Rama (also known as The Imp) is a 1988 American comedy horror film directed by David DeCoteau, loosely based on the classic short story The Monkey's Paw. Notable for scream queens Linnea Quigley, Brinke Stevens, and Michelle Bauer appearing together, its plot follows an imp accidentally released and causing havoc among a group of teenagers inside a mall.

Filmed in 1987 and produced by Charles Band's Urban Classics, the film had a limited release in January 1988 and was later released to home video. In later years, it gained recognition as a "so-bad-it's-good" cult film.

Plot
Three nerdy frat boys, Calvin, Jimmie, and Keith, follow and spy on the Tri-Delta sorority group, which is holding an initiation ceremony. Sorority members Babs, Rhonda, and Frankie prepare for the ritual while newcomers Taffy and Lisa wait. Observed by the frat boys outside their house, the two initiates get spanked by a paddle and are sprayed with whipped cream during the initiation. While the girls clean themselves, the boys enter the house; the girls catch them there. The boys are then sent, with the pledges, on a mission to steal a trophy from a nearby bowling alley. Unbeknownst to them, Babs' father runs the mall where the bowling alley is located and watches the group through security cameras.

The group enters the bowling alley and encounters Spider, a stoic biker burgling the alley with a crowbar. With her help, they break into the trophy room and, upon accidentally dropping the bowling trophy, unleash an imp named Uncle Impie who offers each of them one wish for freeing him. Jimmie is granted his wish of gold stacks, Taffy her wish of being the Prom Queen, and Keith his wish of having sex with Lisa. Suspicious of Uncle Impie, Spider and Calvin decline his offer.

Uncle Impie then attacks the sorority trio from the camera; Frankie is turned into the Bride of Frankenstein; and Rhonda is turned into a demon minion; Babs flees. After Babs is rendered unconscious from touching the mall's doors (which Uncle Impie has electrified to keep the group from leaving), the group finds out that the wishes requested were not really granted, with Jimmie's gold made out of wood and Taffy's dress disappearing.

The minions kill Jimmie and use his head as a bowling ball, and an enchanted Lisa tries furiously to have sex with Keith. Spider and Calvin hide from Rhonda in a closet, where they find a pistol; they shoot Rhonda, then flee. After escaping Lisa, Rhonda kills Keith by shoving his face into a stove, and the minions pull Taffy apart. Babs awakes and fights Rhonda, shoving her into the alley where she is seemingly killed by Spider, with a bowling ball. With Rhonda dead, Babs is possessed and turned into a demon minion.

Spider and Calvin find the janitor, who reveals that the Imp was summoned to help a lousy bowler become a champion, and the Imp was trapped for 30 years due to the creature killing people (the bowler was blamed and executed for the deaths). Meanwhile, after Babs kills Lisa, no longer under Impie's spell, with a paddle, she is burned to death with a Molotov cocktail tossed by Calvin. After Spider and Calvin find the janitor dead, they are chased by Frankie with an axe. Spider gains the upper hand and decapitates her, and the severed head knocks the doors open. While Calvin starts up a car and is attacked by Rhonda from the backseat, Spider successfully traps Uncle Impie in a box. Calvin struggles to control the car, and ends up crashing upside down. Spider cries out for Calvin and runs to his aid.  Calvin survives while Rhonda is killed from the crash.

As day breaks, Spider drives Calvin to her house on her motorcycle while Uncle Impie is seen trapped in the box at the curb, asking someone to let him out, including the audience of the film.

Cast
 Linnea Quigley as "Spider"
 Andras Jones as Calvin
 Robin Rochelle as Barbara "Babs" Peterson
 Carla Baron as Frankie
 Kathi O'Brecht as Rhonda
 John Stuart Wildman as Keith
Hal Havins as Jimmie
 Brinke Stevens as "Taffy"
 Michelle Bauer as Lisa
 Dukey Flyswatter as Uncle Impie (credited as The Imp)
 George "Buck" Flower as The Janitor

Production
Production for the film began and ended within 12 days in September 1987, in the state of California. Filming locations included the Plaza Camino Real and Eagle One Bowl. Due to the low budget, the movie had to be filmed in the bowling alley at night when it was closed, until 9 a.m., when it opened.

The director, David DeCoteau, was referenced in the story as David McCabe, and his film Creepozoids can be seen on Calvin's television in the beginning.

Early trailers for the film featured a high-pitched voice for the Imp; the final film used a lower-pitched voice. The bowling trophy from which Uncle Impie is released is made out of balsa wood.

After production ended, DeCoteau reused the same cast and crew in Nightmare Sisters.

Release
The film was given a limited release theatrically in the United States by the Charles Band-funded Urban Classics in January 1988.

The film was titled The Imp for its home video release in the United Kingdom, and also aired on USA Up All Night in the early 1990s.

Cult Video, a subsidiary of Full Moon Entertainment, released the film on DVD in the United States in 1999.

Reception 
From contemporary reviews, the film was reviewed by a critic credited as "Lor." in Variety who reviewed the film on January 30, 1988. "Lor." stated the film begins like a wornout genre of nerds/peeping toms looming over attractive young women but that the "story takes a more interesting turn with the involvement of the imp. "Lor." continued that the creature was "an okay creation" and praised Michelle Bauer and Linnea Quigley in their respective roles.

JoBlo.com and Cinema Crazed both wrote favorable reviews of the movie, the latter writing, "It's trash, there's no arguing that, but in the end it's entertaining trash". Daily Grindhouse had a similar opinion, stating, "If you watch it with a sense that what you’re basically doing the visual equivalent of eating an entire box of BooBerry cereal, you can take these matters with a grain of salt, and enjoy it for its ridiculousness, and for the funny Imp puppet." AllMovie panned the film and gave it one star. Michael Jausonis of the Providence Journal declared it "half a star, but the title deserves five stars".

Static-X Usage 
The American Industrial Metal band, Static-X used a snippet of audio between Andras Jones' character, Calvin talking to Linnea Quigley's character, Spider, in their song "I'm With Stupid" off of their 1999 studio album Wisconsin Death Trip.

Sequel
Full Moon Features released Sorority Babes in the Slimeball Bowl-O-Rama 2 on December 2, 2022. The film was directed by Brinke Stevens. Stevens and  Michelle Bauer, her co-star from the original film, have cameos. They are joined in the cast by Kelli Maroney, Glory Rodriguez, and Audrey Neal. 

In April 2019, Full Moon Features announced a sequel to the film as part of their Deadly Ten promotion. The planned film promises the return of the stars of the original film - Linnea Quigley, Brinke Stevens, and Michelle Bauer - along with original director David DeCoteau, who will co-direct with Stevens.

References

Sources

External links 
 
 

American teen horror films
American comedy horror films
1988 horror films
Empire International Pictures films
1988 films
Films set in 1986
Films about fraternities and sororities
Films directed by David DeCoteau
Films scored by Guy Moon
Films shot in California
1980s English-language films
1980s American films